Mue Nuer Mek (lit: Hand Above the Cloud; English title: Last Legend) was a Thai action/drama series or lakorn  in heroic bloodshed style, like the 1997 film Dang Bireley's and Young Gangsters. It's a remake of a 1984 namesake film (lead role by Sorapong Chatree and directed by Bhandit Rittakol).  It's different from other Thai drama, where it gathers many stunt performers to jointly acted. Aired on Channel 7 in mid-2017 after the end of Phring, Khon Rerng Muang.

Plot summary
Three young men who are good friends with each other belong to a mafia gang. But then all the events make their friendship come to an end.

Cast
Main characters
 Chanapol Sataya as Jom
 Rapeepat Ekpankul as Chead
 Thun Thanakorn as Bovorn
 Kavita Chindawath as Boonta
 Nattasha Nauljam as Pornpan
 Parnthorthong Boonthong as Jampa
Supporting characters

Gang members of Jao Sua Kim
 Satawat Donlayavijit as Jao Sua Kim or Sua Kim (Mogul Kim)
 AIZEN as Tong
 Ganitharin Prachrapakdeechode as Sichon
Gang members of Nai Hua Buan
 Surawoot Maikan as Nai Hua Buan (Boss Buan) 
 Puchong Sartnok as Tia
 Winai Wiangyangkung as Nat
Gang members of Sia Heng
 Chalermporn Pumpanwong as Sia Heng (Mogul Heng) 
 Charlie Ruedpokanon as Toey
 Somjai Janmoontree as Ah Jai
 Than Wong as Pom
Police officers of Sarawat Asawin
 Oliver Bever as Sarawat Asawin (Inspector Asawin)
 Rattawit Sahaya as Ja Joi (Sergeant Joi)
 Luis Chernyim as Ja Chum (Sergeant Chum)
Other characters
 Samart Payakaroon as Lung Ban (Uncle Ban) 
 Supakorn Kitsuwon as Yai
 Kasab Champadib as Woeng Nakhon Kasem
 Suthita Ketanont as Jaem
 Pichet Sriracha as Joem 
 Vanessa Bever as Pi Ganda (Sister Ganda)
 Puang Chernyim as Luang Pi (Venerable Brother)
 Rattasin Nalintanapat as Sutham
 Simon Kuke as Nan Kam
 John Bravo as Tua Ngok
Guest appearances
 Patson Sarindu as Phu Kan Kamron (Commander Kamron) 
 Weerachai Hattagowit as Ja Prateep (Sergeant Prateep) 
 Wacharachai Sunthornsiri as Khun Pan

Reception and ratings
When it aired, it was ranked 8th for the first episode of the series on Channel 7 in 2017. The ratings aren't high, however, it's considered to be the highest rated series to be released during that same time. But in the last two episodes, it got a higher rating than The Mask Singer (season 2), a highly rated singing competition program on Workpoint TV.

In the tables below, the  represent the highest ratings and the  represent the lowest ratings.

Awards

References

External links
  
 Official teaser 

Thai television soap operas
2017 Thai television series debuts
2017 Thai television series endings
Thai action television series
Martial arts television series
Television series set in the 1950s
Television series set in the 1960s
Channel 7 (Thailand) original programming